John McDonald Galbraith (4 April 1898 – ?) was a Scottish professional footballer. He was born in Renton, West Dunbartonshire.

Galbraith began his career playing junior football at Vale of Leven and Shawfield before signing for Clapton Orient in 1921. He went on to spend a decade at the club, making 277 league appearances, before joining Cardiff City in February 1931. He was signed as a replacement for the club's FA Cup-winning captain Fred Keenor, but was unable to stop the club's slide as they fell into the Third Division South. He left the club in 1935 to manage Milford United, before later returning to Clapton Orient as a coach. Between 1936 and 1938, and for a short spell in 1939, Galbraith managed French side RC Lens.

References

1898 births
Scottish football managers
Scottish footballers
Scottish expatriate football managers
Association football fullbacks
Leyton Orient F.C. players
Cardiff City F.C. players
English Football League players
RC Lens managers
Year of death missing
Vale of Leven F.C. players
Shawfield F.C. players
Milford United F.C. managers
Scottish expatriate sportspeople in France
Expatriate football managers in France
People from Renton, West Dunbartonshire
Footballers from West Dunbartonshire
Scottish Junior Football Association players